Owls Head Mountain is a   mountain in the Adirondack Mountains region of New York. It is located west-southwest of the hamlet of Long Lake in Hamilton County. 

It can be climbed from a trailhead on Endion Road off New York Route 30, just north of the hamlet of Long Lake. The view from the summit includes  Long Lake, part of the Raquette River. The Owls Head Mountain Forest Fire Observation Station, a  Aermotor steel fire tower affords a 360-degree view of the central Adirondacks and Adirondack High Peaks region; nearer peaks include Kempshall Mountain on the shore of Long Lake, and the fire towers of Blue Mountain, Wakely Mountain, Snowy Mountain, Goodnow Mountain and Mount Arab. The trail to the summit passes the foundation of the old fire observer's cabin.

After a 1908 forest fire destroyed nearby Long Lake West (now known as Sabattis), New York State Conservation Department built a wooden fire tower on Owls Head Mountain in 1911 that was replaced in 1919 by the present tower.  The tower was closed in 1970 as airplanes replaced fire observers.  It has been restored and opened to the public.

References

External links 
 Summit Post
 Saranac Lake.com
 The Fire Towers of New York
 

Mountains of Hamilton County, New York
Adirondacks
Mountains of New York (state)